Oras Sultan Naji (1962 – 26 February 2015) was a member of the House of Representatives of Yemen from 1997 until her death. She was a member of the General People's Congress (GPC) party. She was one of only two women to have sat in the Yemeni parliament, the other being Uluf Bakhubaria, who was also elected in 1997.

References

1962 births
2015 deaths
20th-century Yemeni politicians
21st-century Yemeni politicians
20th-century Yemeni women politicians
21st-century Yemeni women politicians
Members of the House of Representatives (Yemen)
General People's Congress (Yemen) politicians